The Nihonkai montane deciduous forests ecoregion (WWF ID: PA0428) covers the Nihonkai (Sea of Japan-side) mountain slopes of Japan's central island of Honshu, including most of the northern half of the island.  Also included in the ecoregion are the forested lowland hills of the Oshima Peninsula, which is the southern extension of Hokkaido Island.

Location and description 
The ecoregion stretches for  up the western side of Honshu, from Wakasa Bay in the south and expanding to cover the breadth of the island by the time it reaches the northern coast. Throughout the ecoregion, individual mountain peaks rise above the zone of deciduous trees into the Honshu alpine conifer forests ecoregion.

Climate 

Flora and fauna 
The climate is cooler in the north of Honshu than the south, with deciduous trees typified by Japanese beech (Fagus crenata) and Jolcham oak (Quercus serrata).

Protected areas 
Protected areas in the ecoregion include:
 Bandai-Asahi National Park
 Chūbu-Sangaku National Park
 Oze National Park

References 

Palearctic ecoregions
Ecoregions of Japan
Temperate broadleaf and mixed forests
Montane forests